El Sakkakini is a small district (quarter) in Cairo, Egypt that neighbours the El Zaher and Abbaseya districts.

El Sakkakini was originally part of El Zaher, but it was named after a huge building built by a prominent French architect, and was owned by patriarch (head of the family), Count Gabriel Habib Sakkakini Pasha (1841–1923), consisting of a palace and a church in the same area in 1897. In addition, Sakkakini Pasha, is known to have established the Roman Catholic Patriarchate in Faggala and the Roman Catholic Cemetery in Old Cairo.

Famous residents
 Taha Hussein
 The Palestinian president Yasser Arafat was raised in Sakkikini in the 1930s.
 The composer Halim El-Dabh was born in Sakkakini in 1921.

References

See also
Khalil al-Sakakini

Districts of Cairo
Churches in Egypt